Pittier's crab-eating rat (Ichthyomys pittieri) is a species of semiaquatic rodent in the family Cricetidae.
It is endemic to Venezuela.
The natural habitats of this species are rivers and swamps. Its karyotype has 2n = 92 and FNa = 98. This was previously thought to be the highest chromosome number known for a mammal, but it has since been found that the plains viscacha rat or red viscacha rat (Tympanoctomys barrerae) has 4x = 2n =  102.

References

Ichthyomys
Mammals of Venezuela
Mammals described in 1963
Taxonomy articles created by Polbot